The women's kumite +68 kilograms competition at the 2010 Asian Games in Guangzhou, China was held on 25 November 2010 at the Guangdong Gymnasium.

Schedule
All times are China Standard Time (UTC+08:00)

Results

Main bracket

Repechage

References

External links
Official website

Women's kumite 69 kg